Bubur ketan hitam, bubur pulut hitam or bubur injun is an Indonesian sweet dessert made from black glutinous rice porridge with coconut milk and palm sugar or cane sugar. The black glutinous rice are boiled until soft, and sugar and coconut milk are added. It is often described as "black glutinous rice pudding" and is very similar to black rice tong sui made from black rice. It is often served as dessert or snack, for supper, for tea time, anytime of the day; however, it is a popular choice for breakfast for those who prefer sweet treat instead of its savory counterpart bubur ayam.

Names
It is sometimes referred to simply as ketan hitam or pulut hitam, meaning "black glutinous rice", while bubur means porridge in Indonesian and Malay. In most parts of Indonesia, glutinous rice is called ketan, while in Malaysia and also Sumatra in Indonesia, it is called pulut. Slightly different names may be used in different regions of Indonesia, such as ketan item in Javanese areas, and bubuh injin or bubuh injun in Bali. Other than porridge, black glutinous rice is also can be made into fermented delicacies called tapai.

Variants
The most basic variant of bubur ketan hitam only consists of black glutinous rice porridge sweetened with palm sugar. While coconut milk, pandan leaves and a pinch of salt might be added to give aroma. However, in most part of Indonesia, bubur ketan hitam is always served with kacang hijau (mung beans), and accompanied with bread. This black glutinous rice and mung beans combo is often simply called as bubur kacang hijau. Sometimes, a more fancy restaurant's variant is served with additional toppings, such as slices of baked or fried banana, or cinnamon powder.

Gallery

See also

 Bubur cha cha
 List of desserts
 List of porridges

References

Congee
Foods containing coconut
Indonesian Chinese cuisine
Indonesian desserts
Malaysian cuisine
Rice pudding
Street food in Indonesia